Mount Matthias is a mountain rising to   east-northeast of Mount Dockery in the Everett Range of the Concord Mountains, Antarctica. It was mapped by the United States Geological Survey from surveys and U.S. Navy air photos, 1960–64, and was named by the Advisory Committee on Antarctic Names for Lieutenant Commander Jack M. Matthias, U.S. Navy, a maintenance officer and aircraft commander with Squadron VX-6 in Operation Deep Freeze 1968 and 1969.

References

Mountains of Victoria Land
Pennell Coast